The fictional universe of British author J. K. Rowling's Harry Potter series of fantasy novels comprises two distinct societies: the Wizarding World and the Muggle world. In the novels, the Muggle world is the world inhabited by the non-magical majority, with which the Wizarding world exists coextensively, albeit mostly remaining hidden from the non-magical humans. The plot of the series is set in 1990s Britain, but in a veiled and separate shadow society wherein magic is commonly used and practised, and those who can use it live in self-enforced seclusion, hiding their abilities from the rest of the world. The term "Wizarding World" refers to the global wizard community that lives hidden in parallel with the Muggle world; the different terms refer to different communities within the same area rather than separate planets or worlds. Any new works taking place in this universe are released under the "J. K. Rowling's Wizarding World" brand.

Fundamentals

The entire Harry Potter series is set from 1991 to 1998 aside from the opening chapter of the first book, which takes place on 1 November 1981, and the epilogue of the seventh book, which takes place on 1 September 2017. At various points throughout the Harry Potter timeline, flashbacks and flash-forwards depict the 1920s, the 1930s, the 1940s, the 1970s, the 1980s, the 2010s, and the 2020s. The depiction of the Wizarding World is centred on magic, which not only imbues objects such as wands, but is portrayed as an inborn ability. It is also centred on the separation of the wizarding world from the non-wizarding (Muggle) world. Despite being an inherent talent, magic is honed into a skill through the study of various branches of magic and practical training.

A great deal of effort is expended in keeping the Muggles unaware of magic. Originally the two worlds co-existed; however, persecution of those with magic over the centuries necessitated laws designed to keep the existence of the magical world hidden from Muggles. The first and most important statute is the International Statute of Wizarding Secrecy of 1692. Enchantment of Muggle artefacts is forbidden, underage wizards are restricted from using magic outside the school, and any deliberate revelation of magical ability to the Muggle community is punishable.  However, allowances are made for the use of magic in the presence of a Muggle in case of a life-threatening situation (for the wizard or the Muggle). These laws are enforced by the Ministry of Magic, while a special arm of it, the Obliviators, has the job of making certain that Muggles who have seen magic in action will be left with no "inconvenient" memories. Exceptions to the statute of secrecy include wizards' Muggle relatives and high-ranking political leaders; the Prime Minister of the United Kingdom, for instance, is in contact with the Minister for Magic.

As seen in the first chapter of Philosopher's Stone, jubilation and euphoria at Voldemort's first downfall in 1981 led to these rules being momentarily ignored and wizards exposing themselves gratuitously to Muggles, who were greatly puzzled.

Some aspects of the Wizarding World are depicted as being less-than-modern in comparison to the Muggle world, sometimes even old-fashioned or quaint. The technological development of the Wizarding World is substantially behind that of its Muggle counterpart — for instance, candles are used for illumination instead of electrical or gas bulbs/tubes – and owls are used to send messages instead of phone calls or email.  Despite owls’ slowness compared to more modern methods, they can be sent to deliver a message without the sender needing to know the recipient's exact location or phone number.

However, a large number of technologically complex devices do exist, and most of these devices exist in the Muggle world. From a certain perspective, it can be seen that Magic and electricity are the equivalents of each other in their respective worlds. However, electronic equipment tends not to work around magic-filled areas, such as Hogwarts, and Muggle devices used by wizards (such as cameras and radios) can be made to function using magic instead of electricity. Such examples are rare, however; wizards rarely make use of Muggle technology, nor do they have much interest in doing so, even when such technology might make their lives much easier. Pure-blood Wizards are baffled by how Muggle technology works and most have no interest in understanding it (with occasional exceptions, such as Muggle aficionado Arthur Weasley, whose dearest ambition is "to find out how an aeroplane stays up"). "Muggle Studies" classes are offered at Hogwarts for those students with an interest. On several occasions, Harry Potter is tasked with having to explain the workings of commonplace Muggle technology, such as introducing the telephone to Mr. Weasley in Chamber of Secrets; at the beginning of Prisoner of Azkaban, Ron Weasley makes his first telephone call – with disastrous results for Harry.

The Wizarding World has also not embraced modern Muggle modes of information collection and transfer. For instance, instead of pens/pencils, paper, and electronic equipment like computers, Hogwarts students use ink-dipped quills and parchment to take notes, do their homework, and write messages. Wizarding money is also old-fashioned; whilst Muggle Britain was decimalised in 1971, Magical Britons continued with their system of 17 silver Sickles to a gold Galleon, and 29 bronze Knuts to a Sickle (and use only coins, as opposed to paper notes).

The magical world does have at least one train - the Hogwarts Express - pulled by a steam locomotive. There is radio but no television is shown. Magical brooms are mass-produced, with new models coming out regularly, similar to Muggle cars. On the other hand, magical wands are hand made by skilled artisans, each individual wand taking long and painstaking labor. Printing is carried out by mechanical printing presses, rather than by magic (at least, the Quibbler is so produced).

Many aspects of the British Wizarding World have Muggle equivalents. For example, after reaching age of 17 wizards can be licensed to apparate, while Muggles can learn and be licensed to drive cars. In the fifth and seventh years of Hogwarts, or what would be Muggle secondary school, external examinations take place. Some aspects of Muggle pop culture are also mirrored in the Wizarding World, such as rock music, posters, and tabloids. A few young wizards embrace Muggle culture whole-heartedly: as a teenager, Sirius Black filled his room with pictures of Muggle pin-up girls, motorcycles and rock bands in rebellion against his prejudiced, Muggle-hating parents. Muggle music is heard in the film adaptation of Harry Potter and the Order of the Phoenix - music by The Ordinary Boys is heard playing in the background of the Gryffindor common room.

Wizards and witches who are Muggle-born, or are half-bloods (of mixed Muggle and magical parentage) find it easier (or even commonplace) to integrate into Muggle society and take on Muggle trends, as they are predisposed to Muggle ways growing up. Gryffindor student Dean Thomas has frequent references to the adorning of his part of the dormitory with posters of West Ham United Football Club. Albus Dumbledore has expressed interest in Muggle knitting patterns and ten-pin bowling.

Geography

There is no separate "magical land" in the Harry Potter universe; the wizarding world not only coexists alongside the world of Muggles, but also is embedded within it. Only one settlement in Britain, the village of Hogsmeade, is home to an entirely magical population. The vast majority of witches' and wizards' locations are integrated within the wider non-magical area. Wizards will often live in small communities of several families within Muggle villages such as Godric's Hollow in the West Country (home of the Dumbledores and the Potters) or Tinworth in Cornwall. The all-wizard Weasley, Diggory, Lovegood, and Fawcett families live near the Muggle village of Ottery St Catchpole, in Devon. Many wizarding houses in the Harry Potter books are depicted as being on the outskirts of towns, usually isolated from most of the town.

Similarly, the wizarding high street Diagon Alley lies in central London, just off Charing Cross Road. A train called the Hogwarts Express departs from the real King's Cross station, albeit from Platform 9¾. These locations are hidden by a combination of Muggle-repelling charms, illusions, and other magical protections. Many magical locations, such as the Isle of Drear off the coast of Scotland, or the Quidditch World Cup Stadium, and the wizarding prison, Azkaban, are rendered "unplottable", or impossible to locate on a map. This is further banked by the natural tendency of non-magical people to ignore anything they cannot explain or understand. Hogwarts Castle appears as abandoned ruins to any Muggles close enough to see. Although wizarding society lives for the most part directly alongside Muggles, the interaction between the two communities is virtually non-existent since the International Statute of Wizarding Secrecy was introduced in 1692. Few wizards are aware of basic Muggle culture (for instance, most wizards do not understand Muggle clothing customs). On the odd occasions when it may be necessary for a wizard or witch to dress in Muggle clothing, the result is usually comical. While the series is set in Great Britain, there is evidence that the wizarding world has locations throughout the globe. This is shown in Harry Potter and the Goblet of Fire, when it describes many people at the Quidditch World Cup speaking foreign languages. The number of Irish wizards working for the Ministry and attending Hogwarts, as well as the various nationalities attending Beauxbatons and Durmstrang, suggest the wizarding world's borders differ from the geopolitical divisions of the Muggle world. However, countries such as Bulgaria and Ireland have national teams representing them at the Quidditch World Cup - even though the muggles of these countries have no idea that the competition is taking place.

It is also suggested in Harry Potter and the Prisoner of Azkaban that wizards played a part in ancient Egyptian history, and possibly are behind many historical wonders in the modern world such as the Egyptian pyramids and tombs.

Animals and plants

The Wizarding World is home to many magical creatures and plants, some of which are familiar from folklore and myth. Giants, dragons, unicorns, boggarts, and goblins all have roles in the series, while many plants long believed to have magical properties, such as mandrake root, aconite, asphodel and wormwood, also make appearances. Within the stories, the conceit is that these creatures and their magical powers are real, but have been hidden for centuries from the non-magical world by the efforts of wizards, to the point where they have faded into folklore. In Hogwarts, some types of pets are allowed: cats, owls, rats, and toads. J.K. Rowling wrote a spin-off book about magical creatures to complement the main Harry Potter novels, titled Fantastic Beasts and Where to Find Them.

Laws concerning magical creatures
In both the book Fantastic Beasts and Where to Find Them and the film of the same name, laws governing magical creatures are often referenced. Like any laws, these are changed over time and vary from country to country.

There are three distinct definitions for all magical creatures given in the Fantastic Beasts book, which are "Beasts", "Beings" and "Spirits" (spirits being for ghosts) which were defined in 1811 by the British Minister for Magic. "Beings" are defined as "any creature that has sufficient intelligence to understand the laws of the magical community and to bear part of the responsibility in shaping those laws".

Laws have been created surrounding the management of magical creatures, largely for the purposes of their protection, but also to protect wizards from dangerous creatures, govern ownership of certain creatures, and also to hide them from the Muggle world. In the Fantastic Beasts and Where to Find Them film, the political climate of the wizarding community at the time saw a blanket ban on possessing all magical creatures.

Blood purity
The longstanding separation between the wizarding and Muggle worlds in the Harry Potter universe has led many wizards to advocate keeping the two apart. Wizards of pure Muggle parentage are viewed as untrustworthy, foolish, or, in extreme cases, racially inferior. The common practice of wizards marrying Muggles is viewed by such extremists as miscegenation, and they instead advocate maintaining a so-called "purity of blood". This was part of Lord Voldemort's ideology, and the Black family disowned anyone who married a Muggle or half-blood. However, in Harry Potter and the Chamber of Secrets, Hagrid and Ron both maintain that there is probably no such factor as "blood purity", with all wizards (given sufficient research) likely to find in their family history some marriages to Muggles.

Pure-blood
"Pure-blood" is the term applied to wizards and witches who have no Muggle blood, Muggle-borns, or half-bloods at all in their family trees. They are the rarest of the three blood statuses, with J.K. Rowling stating that ten per cent of the wizarding community is made up of pure-bloods. Although technically pure-bloods have no Muggle ancestors, the small wizarding population means that "true" pure-bloods are rare, with some just ignoring or disowning the few Muggles in their family. Identified pure-blood families include the Blacks, Crouches, Fudges, Gaunts (though this line died out before the beginning of Philosopher's Stone), Lestranges, Longbottoms, Malfoys and Weasleys (but the most recent generation has had half-blood members). To maintain their blood purity, some supremacist families have been known to inbreed into their own families by marrying their cousins, resulting sometimes in mental instability and violent natures. The Gaunt family displayed both tendencies by the time of the sixth book.

Pure-blood supremacists believe blood purity is a measure of a wizard's magical abilitynotwithstanding examples of skilled Muggle-born witches and wizards such as Hermione Granger and Lily Potter; and less skilled pure-bloods such as Neville Longbottom (whose skills developed in Deathly Hallows due to his heroism)and Muggles to be low-life, having no magic in them. Supremacists apply the term "blood traitor" to pure-bloods who marry and have children with non-pure-bloods.

The pure-blood wizards and witches featured in the Harry Potter books are almost all supremacists, while there are some of them who do not advocate ancestral superiority; the Potters, Weasleys, and Longbottoms are old pure-blood families, but no known members of these families are sympathetic to supremacist aims. The Black family, traditionally pure-blood supremacists, also seem to have produced one or two such "black sheep" in every generation, namely Sirius and Andromeda (Bellatrix and Narcissa's sister who married Muggle-born Ted Tonks).

Several wizards question the notion of blood purity altogether. In his copy of The Tales of Beedle the Bard (later bequeathed to Hermione Granger), Dumbledore made annotations that he thinks the much-vaunted blood purity does not exist and is only a fiction maintained by the deceptions of supremacist wizards.

Half-blood
"Half-blood" is the term applied to wizards and witches who have both magical and Muggle ancestors in their family trees. They are the most common blood status, far outnumbering pure-bloods and Muggle-borns. Rowling has stated that, of the Hogwarts annual intake, fifty per cent are half-bloods. Pure-blood supremacists view half-bloods as inferior to them, although superior to Muggles and Muggle-borns. The Malfoy family, a family of wealthy wizards who showed disdain to Muggles, attempted to maintain blood purity but found it acceptable to marry half-bloods if there was a dearth of marriageable pure-bloods.

Voldemort is a half-blood, and his most guarded secret which few wizards know is that his father was Tom Riddle, a Muggle. Severus Snape is also a half-blood (he gave himself the nickname "The Half-Blood Prince"), as his father Tobias Snape was a Muggle. Harry himself is a half-blood, since his pure-blood father, James, married a Muggle-born witch named Lily, and his maternal grandparents were Muggles.

Muggle-born
"Muggle-born" is the term applied to wizards and witches whose parents are Muggles. Rowling has stated they are the second-most common of the three blood statuses of wizards, numbering about 25 per cent of the wizarding community. They are often believed to be descended from Squibs who married Muggles, and the dormant magical gene may resurface after a couple of generations. Harry Potter's mother, Lily Evans, and his best friend, Hermione Granger, were Muggle-born. Unlike children of wizarding families who receive their Hogwarts acceptance letter via an owl, a Hogwarts employee will usually hand-deliver the letter to Muggle-borns in order to meet with their Muggle parents and explain.

Supremacists typically believe Muggle-borns to be magically deficient, despite examples to the contrary, such as Hermione and Lily, who are exceptionally skilled in their abilities.

Pure-blood supremacists refer to Muggle-borns with the offensive derogatory term "Mudblood". Hagrid was shocked to find out that Draco Malfoy uttered the term to Hermione in order to insult and provoke her, since the slur is never used in proper conversations. Hermione, after being tortured by Bellatrix Lestrange due to her blood status, decided to reclaim use of the term "Mudblood" with pride instead of shame in an effort to defuse its value as a slur.

During Voldemort's rule, Muggle-borns were legally required to register with the Muggle-Born Registration Commission, headed by Dolores Umbridge. During this time, the Department of Mysteries claimed that Muggle-borns acquired their magical ability by stealing magic and wands from "real" wizards. Other wizards and witches rejected this notion, such as Ron Weasley, questioning how one could steal magic and if you could steal magic then squibs would not exist. After the fall of Voldemort, Dolores Umbridge is imprisoned in Azkaban while the remaining members of the commission are either imprisoned or become fugitives.

Squibs
"Squib" is the term applied to a child who is born to magical parents, but who develops no magical abilities. They are considered to be the opposite of Muggle-born wizards and witches. Squib births are rare: the only Squibs noted as such in the books are Argus Filch, Arabella Figg, and Molly Weasley's second cousin, who became an accountant. The Ministry does not require them to be registered as part of the community. Squibs share some things with wizards and they are aware of and comprehend the wizarding world. They can also see Hogwarts and Dementors, which ordinary Muggles cannot. However, according to Ron's Aunt Muriel, the custom with Squibs has been to send them to Muggle schools and encourage them to integrate into the Muggle world, which is "much kinder" than keeping them in the wizarding world where they will always be "second-class". In contrast to most of the wizarding world's acceptance and even respect for Muggles and Muggle-born wizards and witches, it is often considered embarrassing to have a Squib in the family. Neville once said that his family originally thought he was a Squib until his great-uncle Algie dropped him out of a second-story window and Neville bounced down the road. Albus Dumbledore's sister Ariana, an obscurial, was inaccurately thought to be a Squib.

Mixed species
Some wizards are the products of unions between humans and magical creatures of more-or-less human intelligence, such as Fleur Delacour and her sister Gabrielle (both quarter veela), Professor Flitwick (a quarter goblin), and Madame Maxime and Hagrid (both half giant). Prejudiced wizards (such as Umbridge) often use the insulting term "half-breed" to refer to mixed-species wizards and werewolves, like Remus Lupin and Fenrir Greyback, or to other beings such as house elves, merfolk and centaurs (who are separate species). The centaurs within the series prefer to exist amongst themselves, with little interaction with humans.

Government and politics

The Ministry of Magic is the government for the magical community of Britain. The government is first mentioned in Harry Potter and the Philosopher's Stone. The Minister for Magic, Cornelius Fudge, is the first minister to make an appearance in Harry Potter and the Chamber of Secrets. The Ministry itself is not shown until Harry Potter and the Order of the Phoenix. As the books progress, the Ministry becomes more corrupt and blind to happenings in the Wizard world, reaching a nadir of corruption during Voldemort's uprising.

Known Ministers for Magic include Millicent Bagnold (before the books begin), Cornelius Fudge, Rufus Scrimgeour, Pius Thicknesse (under the Imperius Curse, controlled indirectly by Lord Voldemort), Kingsley Shacklebolt (at first temporarily, but later known to be permanent) and Hermione Granger.

Relations

To the Muggle world
The Muggles remain, for the most part, oblivious to the wizarding world. This situation is considered preferable to the alternative by wizards; official coexistence, conflict, or wizard supremacy (advocated by some pure-blood supremacists). Most things of magical nature are hidden or otherwise obscured from Muggles; others, such as Dementors, are invisible to them, although they experience the same depression and sense of manifest darkness and despair while near a Dementor. It is commented that Muggles generally dismiss anything they cannot explain.  Likewise, to many magical people, many functional aspects of the Muggle world are rarely glimpsed and mysterious. Wizards and witches' attempts to disguise themselves as Muggles, as when they have to venture out onto "normal" streets, often have humorous results. When magic is seen in the muggle world, the Ministry of Magic is often tasked with clean-up. The mispronunciation of common Muggle terms like "telephone", "escalator", "plumber", "firearms", "policeman" or "electricity", as "fellytone", "escapator", "pumble", "firelegs", "please-men", and "eckeltricity" respectively, is a running gag in the series. Arthur Weasley is known for being fascinated with the muggle world and has a vast collection of muggle objects.

Muggle Studies is an option of study at Hogwarts. However, while some professions require its study, to others it is often considered a "soft option". Hermione surprised Harry by taking the course, as her parents are Muggles. She explained that she thought it would be "fascinating" to study Muggles from the wizarding point of view.

The only official relations described with the Muggle world are between the Minister for Magic and the Muggle Prime Minister. In Harry Potter and the Half-Blood Prince it is revealed that the Minister for Magic privately introduces himself to each new Prime Minister and briefs him on the important matters of the Magical world. There is a magical painting in the Prime Minister's office that notifies him of such visits, and a fireplace that is connected to the Floo Network, which is how the Minister for Magic travels to 10 Downing Street. Minister for Magic Cornelius Fudge informed the Prime Minister of the escape of Sirius Black. Fudge also informed the Prime Minister that several problems he was facing were rooted in the war against Voldemort and that the Prime Minister's new secretary Kingsley Shacklebolt was an Auror. Fudge treats the Muggle Prime Minister with condescension, and the Muggle Prime Minister is often frustrated by the Minister for Magic.

The exact extent to which the secrecy and isolation of the wizarding world is maintained varies. Many references are made to the Ministry of Magic performing memory charms to preserve secrecy; however, some Muggles have necessary interactions with the wizarding world. Hermione's parents are Muggles, but have been seen in Diagon Alley. They are fully aware that magic exists, but they forbade Hermione to use magic to fix her teeth (as dentists, they felt that this was cheating). The Dursleys are also aware of the Wizarding World; Petunia Dursley indicates that she learned of it when her sister, Lily, was accepted for Hogwarts. She shared this information with her husband, who is shown to be contemptuous of the wizarding world even before Harry shows up at their doorstep. There is no indication that Dudley was aware of this until Harry is told about Hogwarts.

Along with the families of Muggle-born wizards, there are mixed marriages. Seamus Finnigan reports that his mother was a witch who did not inform his Muggle father of her magical abilities until after they were married.

There is also some unspecified financial relationship between the two worlds, as it is possible to exchange Muggle money into wizard money. Hermione's parents are shown doing this in the second book.

Policies on wizard-muggle relationships
In Harry Potter and the Prisoner of Azkaban, Harry writes an essay on medieval witch burning, which was cited as the reason behind the introduction of the International Statute of Wizarding Secrecy, and wizards going into hiding from the Muggle world.

This is further explored in other novels and is notably covered in some depth in The Tales of Beedle the Bard, where Albus Dumbledore writes notes after each story that often concern Wizard-Muggle relationships. Part of these 'observations' note how The Tales were modified in the face of anti-Muggle sentiments, in order to remove any pro-Muggle messages for wizards who did not want their children exposed to those messages. This included Lucius Malfoy, who demanded that the Tales be removed from the Hogwarts syllabus.

Fantastic Beasts and Where to Find Them shows that different wizarding governments around the world may have different levels of relationships with Muggles depending on their social and political climate and that these relationships may even change over time like other political policies. In the film, Newt Scamander describes American wizarding law in regard to Muggles as "rather backward", and further explains that American wizards are forbidden from having any contact or relationships with Muggles.

Internally

Since a person's most important capability – magical aptitude – does not depend on sex, sexual equality is highly advanced in the Wizarding World, and the "battle of the sexes" never became much of an issue (for example, Quidditch teams have both male and female players – except for a known example, the Holyhead Harpies, which are an all-female team).

The most obvious example of wizard prejudice is a longstanding disdain, even a genocidal hatred, toward Muggles and wizards and witches of Muggle parentage (Muggle-borns, half-bloods) among certain wizards. This has led to a eugenic philosophy among some of the older wizarding families, leading to a practice of "pure-blood" intermarriage that has exposed many of them (such as the Gaunt family) to the risks of mental instability.

Other internal tensions include the slavery of house elves and the suspicion or disregard for some species of near-human intelligence ("beings" in Wizard parlance). Voldemort and his allies frequently exploit these divisions to bring non-human magical creatures, particularly werewolves and giants, over to their cause.

Internationally
The magical governments of the world are to some degree united in the International Confederation of Wizards. This organisation has many responsibilities, mostly to enforce the International Statute of Wizarding Secrecy.

There is a reference to the Ministry of Magic's Department of International Magical Cooperation
and to various international bodies such as the International Magical Trading Standards Body, the International Magical Office of Law, the International Confederation of Wizards and the International Quidditch Association.

As noted in the depiction of the Quidditch World Championship in Goblet of Fire, Irish and Bulgarian wizards (and presumably, also those from other countries) can feel a strong national pride and be intensely eager for their country to win – even though Irish and Bulgarian Muggles, who form most of the population in the two countries, are not aware that the Championship is taking place.

The books do not refer to the degree to which wars and tensions between Muggle governments (e.g., the World Wars or the Cold War) influence the relations between the respective wizarding governments. However, Rowling has strongly implied that the rise of the dark wizard Gellert Grindelwald and his defeat by Dumbledore in 1945 were related to the rise and fall of Nazi Germany.

Education

Before Hogwarts
There appears to be no official precursor to a magical education; apparently, wizard parents home-school their children in basic non-magical topics, such as literacy and arithmetic. Muggle-born wizards (or Muggle-raised wizards), however, clearly experience an ordinary Muggle primary education before enrolling at Hogwarts, something that could be viewed as either a cognitive edge or a disadvantage. There are also no compulsory educational laws that exist in the British Wizarding World. Parents may continue to home-school their children, send them to Hogwarts, or send them abroad to other wizarding schools. However, during the time Voldemort had overthrown the Ministry of Magic, attendance at Hogwarts was compulsory, so that his followers could have complete control over the wizarding youth.

After Hogwarts
Following completion of a Hogwarts education, there is no standard tertiary education, and there are no known wizard universities. Successful Hogwarts students are considered ready to function as adults, though some wizarding professions do require special, years-long training programmes after finishing Hogwarts. These include the professions of the Auror and the Healer (the wizard physician). Sometimes, the young travel the world to "observe foreign witches and wizards" after graduation to complete their education. In the Deathly Hallows, Elphias Doge describes how his plans to travel the world with his friend Dumbledore were disrupted by the death of the latter's mother. Similarly, Professor Quirrell took time off to gain first-hand experience after a celebrated academic career.

Wizarding Examinations Authority
The Wizarding Examinations Authority is an organisation responsible for examining students in their fifth and seventh years taking their O.W.L. and N.E.W.T. exams. These relate to the Muggle world's GCSE and A-Level examinations in English, Welsh and Northern Irish schools (National 5 and Higher in Scottish schools) in the UK. The head of the authority, Griselda Marchbanks, is an elderly witch who examined a school-aged Dumbledore in his N.E.W.T.s.

O.W.L.s 
Ordinary Wizarding Levels (O.W.L.s) are wizarding examinations taken in the fifth year. O.W.Ls affect what jobs a witch or wizard is eligible for after school, and are presided over by the Wizarding Examinations Authority (see above).

Grading

N.E.W.T.s 
Nastily Exhausting Wizarding Tests (N.E.W.T.s) are wizarding examinations taken in the seventh year. N.E.W.T.s are the final tests to see what jobs a witch or wizard is eligible for. While Hermione goes back to Hogwarts to take her exams in the aftermath of Harry Potter and the Deathly Hallows, Harry and Ron never take their N.E.W.T.s. In spite of this, Harry manages to become the head of the Department of Magical Law Enforcement at some point in the future.

Known foreign schools
 Beauxbatons Academy of Magic in France
 Durmstrang Institute for Magical Learning in Northern Europe
 Ilvermorny School of Witchcraft and Wizardry in North America
 Uagadou in Africa
 Mahoutokoro in Japan
 Castelobruxo in Brazil
 Koldovstoretz in Russia

Economy
[[File:Gringotts Wizarding Bank.jpg|thumb|right|Gringotts Bank film set at The Making of Harry Potter]]
A fictional system of currency is used by the wizards of the United Kingdom. The currency uses only coins as the units of account. It is based on three types of coin; in order of decreasing value, the gold Galleon, the silver Sickle, and the bronze Knut. Wizarding banks provide money-changing services for those with Muggle currency. The only bank seen in the Harry Potter series is Gringotts, which is located in Diagon Alley in London and has hundreds of vaults. Account-holders may use these vaults to store anything they wish. Hagrid indicates that wizards have "just the one" bank, and considers Gringotts to be the most secure place to store valuable or sensitive items aside from Hogwarts.

Some Gringotts employees are stationed in countries other than England and tasked with recovering treasure for use by the bank. Bill Weasley is introduced as one such employee, working in Egypt as a curse-breaker to extract riches from ancient tombs.

Coins
The Galleon is the largest and most valuable coin in the British wizard currency. It is gold, round and larger than the other coins in use.

Around the rim of the Galleon is inscribed at least one serial number, which identifies the goblin who was responsible for minting the coin. In Harry Potter and the Order of the Phoenix, Hermione enchants fake Galleons to show the time and date of the next Dumbledore's Army meeting instead of the serial number.

As explained in Harry Potter and the Philosopher's Stone there are 17 silver Sickles to a gold Galleon, and 29 bronze Knuts to a Sickle.

According to Pottermore, the wizards never changed their units of measurement (i.e. feet to metres, ounces to grams, pounds to kilograms, etc.) because they can do the calculations with magic, so strange number conversions (17 and 29 are both prime numbers) do not bother them.

Exchange rate

In a 2001 interview, J. K. Rowling said a Galleon was approximately five pounds (at the time of the interview approximately US$7.50 or €5.50), although "the exchange rate varies."

In the book Fantastic Beasts and Where to Find Them, it is said that the £174 million raised for charity is equivalent to 34,000,872 Galleons, 14 Sickles, and 7 Knuts (the figure is truncated to "over thirty-four million Galleons" in Quidditch Through the Ages). This means that £5.12 = 1 galleon. However, the book's cover price is £2.50 ($3.99 US), or "14 Sickles and 3 Knuts," which implies either an exchange rate of £3.01 = 1 galleon or a 41% discount to Muggle purchasers.

Games and sports
Sports, specifically Quidditch, play an important role in the Wizarding world, and in the Harry Potter series. Quidditch is a team sport played up in the air on brooms. Wizards all around the globe fanatically follow it in a similar manner to football, and the Quidditch World Cup is a major event on the wizard calendar.

Not long into his first year at Hogwarts, Harry proves himself a talented Quidditch player and is named to the Gryffindor team as its Seeker, with the role of finding and catching the Golden Snitch. His activities on the Quidditch pitch feature prominently in several of the books. Lee Jordan, two years older than Harry, serves as the commentator for the Quidditch matches at Hogwarts until he graduates. The sport appears in every book except the seventh; school matches are canceled in the fourth due to the need to use the pitch for the Triwizard Tournament, but Harry attends the Quidditch World Cup as a guest of the Weasley family.

Other wizard games and sports include Gobstones (a version of marbles in which the stones squirt foul-smelling liquid into the other player's face when they lose a point), Exploding Snap (a card game in which the cards explode), and Wizard Chess (in which the pieces are sentient and under the command of the player). The wizarding world is also home to a number of other wizard spectator sports, such as Creaothceann (a now-banned broom game from Scotland in which players try to catch rocks with cauldrons strapped to their heads), Quodpot (a popular game in the United States involving a Quaffle that explodes), and broom racing.

Communications
Several magical communication methods are available to the wizarding world.

Owls
By far the most popular method of communication is via owls. Owls are used for conveying packages, with multiple owls acting in concert to deliver heavier packages. Owls also deliver mail and newspapers, acting as a replacement for the postal service of the Muggle world. If an owl delivers something for which payment is expected, such as a newspaper, the recipient places the money in a small pouch attached to the owl's leg. Not only owls may be used; Sirius Black makes use of a tropical bird, likely a macaw, on one occasion. The Ministry of Magic regulates Owl Mail.

How the owls find the recipients of the letters they carry is not specifically stated. In some circumstances, letters have extremely explicit addresses on them (specifying rooms or locations inside of a building). Other times, there is no mention of an address, and the owl is simply told to whom to deliver. The Ministry of Magic used to use owls to deliver inter-office mail within the ministry building, but according to Mr. Weasley, the mess was incredible. Now the ministry uses enchanted memos, which fly throughout the building as paper aeroplanes, rather than owls.

In addition, though owls are portrayed as flying directly to the recipient of their package, it is implied that owl traffic can be monitored and even interrupted. There are several references to "the owls being watched" and Harry uses different owls to communicate with Sirius (his godfather) since his snowy owl, Hedwig, would supposedly attract too much attention. On one occasion Hedwig is injured after being intercepted and searched (supposedly by Umbridge).

Patronuses
A Patronus is primarily used to repel Dementors. They can also be used for communication by accomplished witches and wizards.  Albus Dumbledore devised a method of using Patronuses to deliver vocal messages, putting this to the exclusive use of the Order of the Phoenix. Dumbledore, Minerva McGonagall, Kingsley Shacklebolt, and Arthur Weasley all deliver messages via Patronus in the course of the series. McGonagall is also the only character in the series to have shown the ability to project multiple Patronuses to send multiple messages. Patronuses are also the only known way of repelling Lethifolds.

Severus Snape used his Patronus to lead Harry Potter to the forest pool wherein Gryffindor's sword was hidden in The Deathly Hallows.

 Floo Network 
While the Floo Network (a play on the word 'flue') is intended for use as a method of transport, it also occasionally serves as a method of communication. A wizard can throw a pinch of Floo Powder into a lit fireplace connected to the Network and put their head into the flames, causing it to appear in the fireplace of the wizard with whom they intend to speak. This use of the Network is first seen in Harry Potter and the Goblet of Fire when Harry sees Amos Diggory's head in the Weasleys' fireplace at The Burrow, talking to Molly Weasley. Harry also uses this method to communicate with Sirius Black on several occasions during the series.

The etiquette surrounding using the fireplace for communication is not explicitly addressed in the series. Dumbledore tells Harry it is not polite for a wizard to apparate (appear out of thin air) directly into another wizard's house. However, at one point Harry uses Floo Powder to contact Grimmauld Place unannounced. Severus Snape uses a fireplace to contact Remus Lupin and tell him he wants a word, before speaking to him in person in Harry Potter and the Prisoner of Azkaban.

Dark magic communication
Lord Voldemort uses a method of communication called the Dark Mark, which is like a brand on the inner forearms of the Death Eaters. When the mark is pressed, contact is made with other Death Eaters and Voldemort himself.  Pressing one's Dark Mark causes every other Death Eater's mark to burn, signalling them to Disapparate from wherever they were and immediately Apparate to Voldemort's side.

Those who follow Voldemort consider the Dark Mark to be of great importance, and while some people are 'lucky' enough to have one, the privilege is restricted to those of 'pure' blood. It is stated that Fenrir Greyback (a vicious werewolf) is not allowed the Dark Mark, which is likely because he is a werewolf.

Hermione uses the principle of the Dark Mark in Harry Potter and the Order of the Phoenix. Instead of burning/engraving the message into the members of Dumbledore's Army's skin, she uses fake Galleons which all mimic each other and have messages on the rim. Later Malfoy and Madam Rosmerta, who was under the Imperius Curse, used Galleons to contact each other.

Other forms of communication
Apart from the fake Galleons enchanted by Hermione for Dumbledore's Army, there are a few other methods of closed-channel communications used in the books and films. Subjects painted into wizarding portraits are frequently used to carry messages between locations where their portraits hang. Phineas Nigellus (former Hogwarts headmaster and member of the Black Family) is used to send messages between Dumbledore's office and his other portrait in Grimmauld Place. Hermione takes Phineas from Grimmauld Place during Harry Potter and the Deathly Hallows and uses Phineas to obtain information about events at Hogwarts. Dumbledore also uses two other former headmasters in a similar fashion when Arthur Weasley is attacked by Nagini in the Ministry of Magic. A portrait is also seen carrying messages between the Minister for Magic and the Muggle Prime Minister in the opening of Harry Potter and the Half-Blood Prince.

Another form of closed communication used in the books and films is a set of mirrors that belonged to Sirius Black. Sirius gives Harry one mirror in Harry Potter and the Order of the Phoenix, with a note explaining to Harry that Sirius and James Potter used to use the mirrors to talk to each other when they were put in separate detentions. In Harry Potter and the Deathly Hallows, Harry uses a shard of his broken mirror to call for help from the Malfoy's cellar, and later finds out that Aberforth Dumbledore had been watching over Harry using Sirius' mirror, which he obtained from Mundungus Fletcher.

Flying paper aeroplanes (referred to as "interdepartmental memos") are used within the Ministry of Magic. In Harry Potter and the Order of the Phoenix when Arthur Weasley takes Harry to the Ministry of Magic, Mr. Weasley explains that these took the place of the owls to minimise the mess. They are pale violet with MINISTRY OF MAGIC stamped along the edges of the wings. A variation on this method of communication is shown in the film version of Harry Potter and the Prizoner of Azkaban, when Draco Malfoy sends Harry a note in class in the form of a flying paper crane.

Transportation

Apparition
Wizards and witches often Apparate to their destinations, which is quite similar to teleportation. It is quite difficult to Apparate; therefore underage wizards and witches are forbidden to do it. There are many examples of failed Apparition attempts made by people who have not passed their "Apparition test", which is like a Muggle driving test. If not Apparating correctly, a person may lose a body part in the process, referred to as "splinching". In Deathly Hallows, Ron gets splinched after being grabbed by Yaxley, a Death Eater. 

Transportation objects
Characters in the series make use of several magical devices and artefacts to transport themselves within the Wizarding World and to the Muggle world. Among the most common of these objects are broomsticks, the Floo Network (a network of fireplaces magically connected to one another), the Knight Bus, and the Hogwarts Express. Some characters have been known to enchant Muggle vehicles to have magical features, such as Arthur Weasley's Ford Anglia or Sirius Black's Flying Motorbike. In Harry Potter and the Goblet of Fire, a discussion is held around the politics of importing flying carpets.

Portkeys

Portkeys are used if witches or wizards are unable to Apparate, whether that be because they are unable to or because they have an underage witch or wizard in their company. Portkeys can be almost anything, usually a mundane, everyday object that would easily be overlooked by a muggle. Using the charm "Portus," they are able to carry the user to their destination, so long as the user has hold of the object upon leaving. Portkeys are able to carry multiple people at once, an example being in The Goblet of Fire when Harry, Hermione Granger, the Weasleys and the Diggorys travel to the Quidditch World Cup. Portkeys are usually disguised as rubbish such as a tin can or old sock so Muggles won't notice them.

Thestrals
Thestrals are skeletal, winged horses, black in colour, which can only be seen by those who have witnessed death firsthand. They pull the Hogwarts school coaches and can also be tamed and ridden. This method of transportation was used in Order of the Phoenix, when members of the Dumbledore's Army needed to go to the Ministry of Magic to rescue Sirius Black, and also used when transporting Harry from the Dursleys' house to The Burrow in Deathly Hallows. Other magical birds have also been known to be flown; for instance Fawkes the phoenix by Harry, Ron, Ginny and Lockhart in Chamber of Secrets and Buckbeak the hippogriff by Harry, Hermione and Sirius in Prisoner of Azkaban.Wizarding media

The Daily ProphetThe Daily Prophet is the most widely read daily newspaper in Britain's wizard community. The articles include moving pictures. Its journalistic integrity is lacking; it has been known to be more concerned about sales than about factual accuracy and is often a mouthpiece for the Ministry of Magic; as described by Rita Skeeter, "The Prophet exists to sell itself!"

The Prophet remains respectable for the first three books, but by Goblet of Fire, it has hired Rita Skeeter, an unscrupulous journalist who supplies several thrilling and blatantly false articles. These include an article that, while correctly asserting that Hagrid is part giant, also makes numerous scurrilous accusations about his personal character, and declares Harry "disturbed and dangerous" based on remarks by Draco Malfoy. When Minister Fudge takes the stance of firmly denying Voldemort's return, the Prophet initiates a smear campaign against Dumbledore and Harry, the most influential proponents of the opposing view. After Fudge is forced to admit that Voldemort has returned, the Prophet changes its stance overnight, calling Harry "a lone voice of truth". The newspaper even buys Harry's interview on Voldemort's return from The Quibbler and claims it to be exclusive.

The editor of The Daily Prophet is Barnabas Cuffe, a former pupil of the Potions master Horace Slughorn. It is unclear how long he has been editor of The Daily Prophet. According to J. K. Rowling, in the events after the book series, Ginny Weasley becomes Senior Quidditch correspondent at The Daily Prophet, after her retirement from the Holyhead Harpies. The Daily Prophet has a late edition named The Evening Prophet, and a weekend edition named The Sunday Prophet.

The Warner Bros. Harry Potter website's news and events page has been named after the paper.

The QuibblerThe Quibbler is a magazine first mentioned in Order of the Phoenix.

The magazine's editor is Xenophilius Lovegood. The Quibbler mainstays are conspiracy theories and cryptozoology. Articles in The Quibbler have claimed that Fudge has had goblins cooked in pies, and uses the Department of Mysteries to develop terrible poisons, which he supposedly feeds to people who disagree with him, and that he has a secret army of fire-demons called "heliopaths". Numerous (presumably imaginary) beasts are mentioned in The Quibbler, such as Crumple-Horned Snorkacks (which supposedly live in Sweden and cannot fly), the Blibbering Humdinger and Nargles (which are supposed to infest mistletoe).

In Order of the Phoenix, Hermione blackmails Rita Skeeter into writing an article about Harry's encounter with Voldemort. The interview is published by Xenophilius, and he later sells it to the Daily Prophet for a good price (enough to finance an expedition to Sweden to hunt for the Crumple-Horned Snorkack). In Deathly Hallows, Xenophilius continues to support Harry in his magazine until his daughter Luna gets kidnapped to silence him. Harry, Ron, and Hermione visit Xenophilius for information but discover that the latest issue features an anti-Harry story on the cover. Following Voldemort's ultimate defeat, the Quibbler goes back to its condition of advanced lunacy and becomes popular, still being appreciated for its unintentional humour.

 Radio 
The most popular radio station is the Wizarding Wireless Network. Harry learns about the popular wizarding band The Weird Sisters from his peers who listen to the WWN. Over Christmas with the Weasley family during Harry Potter and the Half-Blood Prince, the Weasley family listens to Celestina Warbeck on the network.

In Harry Potter and the Deathly Hallows, Ron introduces Harry and Hermione to Potterwatch. Potterwatch is an underground anti-Voldemort radio program that is only accessible with a secret password. The Potterwatch episode that the trio listens to features various members of the Order of the Phoenix and is hosted by Lee Jordan.

Some magical radio sets are valve-based, but are constructed by nesting the valves one inside the other, rather than placing them side-by-side as in Muggle equipment. This may suggest a demodulation technology along the lines of heptode or octode superheterodyning, but which includes the power stages driving the loudspeaker.

Food and beverages
The following are food and beverages unique to the wizarding world:

Magical sweets
Multitudes of sweets are referred to in the stories; many have violent or bizarre side effects, especially those created by Fred and George Weasley. Most sweets can be found in the sweetshop Honeydukes or on the Hogwarts Train sweet trolley. Dumbledore seems to be partial to these as he often uses their names as passwords.

Chocolate Frogs are, as the name suggests, frogs made of chocolate, and are very popular wizarding sweets. They are each packaged with a collectible card displaying a magical picture and brief biography of a famous witch or wizard of medieval to modern times. Cards named in the Harry Potter series include wizards such as Merlin, Dumbledore, Nicholas Flamel and the four founders of Hogwarts. According to a webchat with the author, Harry and his friends are eventually featured on a series of Chocolate Frog cards, with Ron calling it "his finest hour".

Some of the most notable magical sweets such as Bertie Bott's Every-Flavour Beans, Skiving Snackboxes and Cockroach Clusters have been manufactured in real life, mainly by the Jelly Belly candy company. They have produced real versions of Bertie Bott's Every-Flavour Beans odd flavours in and out of the market since 2001. Apart from some "regular" flavours, the company also produces several "unusual" flavours mentioned in the books. Other flavours include bacon, dirt, earthworm, earwax, vomit, rotten egg, sausage, pickle, toast, grass and soap.

A description of Honeydukes in the third book says that the store sells candies called Coconut Ice, Ice Mice (which make your teeth chatter and squeak), Fizzing Whizbees, Pepper Imps (which allow you to breathe fire on your friends), Sugar Quills, Cockroach Clusters, self-flossing mints, Drooble's Best Blowing Gum (which make a room fill up with bluebell-coloured bubbles which wouldn't pop for days), Peppermint Creams shaped like toads (which hop in your stomach), Exploding Bonbons, Jelly Slugs, Acid Pops, and blood-flavoured lollipops.

Butterbeer
Butterbeer is the drink of choice for younger wizards. Harry is first presented with the beverage in Harry Potter and the Prisoner of Azkaban. Although house-elves can become intoxicated on Butterbeer, the amount of alcohol contained in Butterbeer has a negligible effect on witches and wizards. J.K. Rowling said in her interview to Bon Appétit magazine that she imagines it "to taste a little bit like less-sickly butterscotch". Butterbeer can be served cold or hot, but either way it has a warming effect.

The earliest reference to buttered beer is from The Good Huswifes Handmaide for the Kitchin, published in London in 1588. It was made from beer, sugar, eggs, nutmeg, cloves and butter. Another old recipe for buttered beer, published by Robert May in 1664 from his recipe book The Accomplisht Cook, calls for liquorice root and aniseed to be added. British celebrity chef Heston Blumenthal recreated the drink for his show "Heston's Tudor Feast".

It was announced in April 2010 that a drink named after butterbeer would be sold in the theme park The Wizarding World of Harry Potter at Universal Orlando. The beverage is also sold at the Warner Bros. Studio Tour London. It has a sweet taste and is a non-alcoholic beverage. It was taste-tested by J. K. Rowling herself. According to Neil Genzlinger, a staff editor on the culture desk of The New York Times, the beverage "is indistinguishable from a good quality cream soda".

Firewhisky

Firewhisky is a type of alcohol that wizards under the age of seventeen are not allowed to drink; however, this rule is not always followed. Firewhisky is described as burning the drinkers' throats as they consume it.

It can be seen as a very strong whisky, and by all intents is used as such. The characters drink it in the last book when Mad-Eye Moody dies in flight, to numb the shock and toast to his life. Hagrid also drinks it, although in much larger quantities.

Pumpkin juice
Pumpkin juice is a cold drink favoured by the Wizarding World, and among the students at Hogwarts School of Witchcraft and Wizardry. It is drunk at any occasion, such as breakfast, lunch, at feasts or on other occasions. It seems to take on the same role that orange juice has to Muggles.

Pumpkin juice is readily available, and can be purchased on the Hogwarts Express. Severus Snape threatened Harry in his fourth year that he might slip Veritaserum in his morning pumpkin juice while believing that Harry had stolen some of Snape's potion ingredients.

Pumpkin juice is one of several speciality beverages developed for Universal's Wizarding World of Harry Potter theme park (along with butterbeer, see above). According to a preview by The New York Times' Neil Genzlinger, "Pumpkin juice (in a cute, pumpkin-topped bottle) is far more interesting [than the park's butterbeer], perhaps because the actual pumpkin content seems minimal – it’s more like a feisty apple cider with a little pumpkin thrown in."

Gillywater
Gillywater is a beverage sold in the Harry Potter universe. Professor McGonagall drinks this in Harry Potter and the Prisoner of Azkaban; Luna Lovegood drinks it in Harry Potter and the Order of the Phoenix.

See also
 The Magical Worlds of Harry Potter''

References

External links
 
 Harry Potter movies – Official website (Warner Bros.)
 Harry Potter at Bloomsbury.com (International publisher)
 Harry Potter at Scholastic.com (US publisher)

 
Mythopoeia

he:הארי פוטר - מונחים